Pacajus is a municipality in Ceará, Northeast Region, Brazil.

See also
List of municipalities in Ceará

References

Municipalities in Ceará